In North America, there is no regional geopark network so far. As of July 2020, there are five UNESCO Global Geoparks in Canada and several aspiring geoparks projects going on, under the framework of the Canadian Geoparks Network. In the United States, there are no active UNESCO Global Geoparks so far, but there are certain plans to establish geoparks, applying for this label. Further elements of the geodiversity of the continent is represented on the World Heritage list, under criterion VIII or VII.

UNESCO Global Geoparks

Aspiring geoparks 

According to the register of Canadian Geoparks Network, the following geopark projects are going on with the future request for UNESCO status. There are further plans to establish geoparks in the United States as well.

The Canadian Geoparks Network 

The Canadian National Committee for Geoparks (CNCG) or the Canadian Geoparks Network was founded in 2009, under the patronage of the Canadian Federation of Earth Sciences (CFES). As the national committee of Canada of the Global Geoparks Network, it is the coordinator of UNESCO Global Geopark applications from Canada and a forum for capacity building among active UNESCO-labeled geoparks and aspiring ones. The committee is helping the currently running and future geopark applications with established guidelines, site visits prior to applications for SWOT analysis.

North America is currently not represented with a regional geopark network in the Global Geoparks Network, such as the Asia Pacific Geoparks Network. With the lack of active UNESCO Global Geoparks in the United States, the Canadian Geoparks Network represent the North American geoparks movement in international conferences and regional meetings.

Recognition of North America's geodiversity under different international frameworks

World Heritage sites 
Sixteen sites are represented currently on the World Heritage list under criterion VIII, as an outstanding representative of Earth's history: 
 Great Smoky Mountains National Park (United States)
 Carlsbad Caverns National Park (United States)
 Mammoth Cave National Park (United States)
 Everglades National Park (United States)
 Grand Canyon National Park (United States)
 Yellowstone National Park (United States)
 Yosemite National Park (United States)
 Joggins Fossil Cliffs (Canada)
 Miguasha National Park (Canada)
 Mistaken Point (Canada)
 Kluane / Wrangell-St Elias / Glacier Bay / Tatshenshini-Alsek (Canada)
 Canadian Rocky Mountain Parks (Canada)
 Dinosaur Provincial Park (Canada)
 Gros Morne National Park (Canada)
 Nahanni National Park (Canada)
 Ilulissat Icefjord (Greenland, Denmark)

Further sites are inscribed under criterion VII of superlative natural phenomena and aesthetic importance. Some of them, which have a special geoheritage importance are:
 Olympic National Park (United States)
 Waterton Glacier International Peace Park (Canada, United States)

Notes

References

External links 
 Canadian Geoparks Network (accessed 22 January 2020)

Geoparks in North America
Geopark networks
North America
UNESCO Global Geoparks